{{Infobox television
| image                = Valt the Wonder Deer cast.jpg
| caption              = The main characters as they appear in the first two seasons.
| alt_name             = Valt the Wonder Deer: The Adventures of the Five Worlds
| native_name          = {{Infobox name module|Mandarin| (season 1) (season 2) (season 3) (season 4)}}
| genre                = 
| creator              =
| developer            = 
| director             = 
| creative_director    = Ron Myrick
| voices               = 
| theme_music_composer = 
| opentheme            = 
| endtheme             = 
| composer             = Scott Healy
| country              = 
| language             = English
| num_seasons          = 4
| num_episodes         = 208
| list_episodes        = #List of Valt the Wonder Deer episodes
| executive_producer   = 
| producer             = 
| editor               = 
| runtime              = 11 minutes(season 1) 13 minutes(season 2)   11 minutes(season 3)  12 minutes(season 4) 
| company              = DreamEast Pictures
| distributor          = Jetpack Distribution
| network              = Tencent Video (China)Propeller TV (United Kingdom)
| picture_format       = HDTV 1080i
| audio_format         = Stereo
| first_aired          = 
| last_aired           = present 
}}Valt the Wonder Deer''' (Valt's Journey in season 1, subtitled The Search for Terracotta Warriors in season 2, Journey to The Land Of Darkness in season 3, Tales of Two Deer in season 4) is an animated television series that was released to Tencent Video in China on December 31, 2016. The series is produced by DreamEast Pictures and is distributed worldwide by Jetpack Distribution.

The second season premiered October 22, 2018, and ended November 26. A third season featuring new anthropomorphic and angular designs for the characters, and was released in 2021. A fourth season is in production featuring new anthropomorphic and angular designs for the characters, and is set to release in 2023.

 Plot 
Season 1Valt the Wonder Deer follows the adventures of Valt, a wonder deer and his five friends as they journey to obtain special powers granted by the Five Magical Elements, as well as rescue his trapped parents, the Deer King and Queen, from the evil overlords of the Land of Metal.

Season 2
After peace and harmony has been restored to the Five Lands, Valt starts to miss his friends even though they're a portal away from him. His vacation however is cut short by more monsters suddenly arriving called the Nanomites; dark, flying swarm of bugs that can turn anything into an enemy. Valt reassembles the guardians to protect the Five Lands, but unbeknownst to him, Da-Ming and his bride are controlling the bugs, and they want to regain their throne.

Season 3
When Valt and his friends left, Kem was all alone until he saw an amulet of darkness. Kem puts on the dark amulet and he became the Lord of Darkness and turned Da-Ming, Mungo, and Drusilla into stone. He wants to destroy the Five Lands and take over the world. Valt and his friends relays that Kem is in danger. So they start their journey to the Land of Darkness and save their friend before it's too late.

Season 4
When the seven friends are in the protect crystal for many years, then everything changed when the army of dark deer broke the crystal. The lord of the dark deer chained Valt and Valanteen with the collars of chain to stay together. But then they were saved by Miko the bunny warrior and their friends. She tells them about a Dark Deer named Marcus has been free from the amulet and unleashed the army of dark deer. They must find their way back and save the Five Lands.

 Characters 
 Main 
 Valt (voiced by Ogie Banks) – The main protagonist. A wonder deer from the Land of Wood.
 Cobalt (voiced by Benjamin Diskin) – A blue monkey and Valt's best friend.
 Kem (voiced by Matthew Christo) – A taotie from the Land of Metal.
 Trika (voiced by Tara Sands) – A yellow cat from the Land of Earth.
 Alia (voiced by Lyra Blake) – An orange fire bird from the Land of Fire.
 Yark (voiced by Christo) – An ice-snorting yak from the Land of Water.
 Valanteen (voiced by Colleen O'Shaughnessy) - a girl Wonder Deer from the Land of Water.
 Miko - a girl bunny warrior  from the Land of Wood.
 Da-Ming (voiced by Christopher Swindle) – An evil taotie, and the main villain of the series. He is green.
 Mungo (voiced by Swindle) – Another evil taotie. He is Da-Ming's nephew and assistant. He is purple.
 Drusilla (voiced by Beth Payne) – Another evil taotie and Da-Ming's wife.
 Urgon – Valt's father.
 Reyna (voiced by Sands) – Valt's mother.
 Marcus - a male Dark Deer from the Land of Darkness and the main villain of the series.

Episodes

 Broadcast 
The first 26 episodes of Valt the Wonder Deer were released on the streaming service Tencent Video in China on December 31, 2016, which garnered over 9 million views in its first two weeks. The second half of the first season was released on February 19, 2017.

In the United Kingdom, the English dub of the series was broadcast on Propeller TV for one season around June 2017. The English dub was released onto Jetpack Distribution's YouTube channel on August 24, 2019, but it was later taken down.

Musical
On May 1, 2019, a Chinese musical for the series, Deer Elf: In Search of the Rainbow Bridge (鹿精灵之寻找彩虹桥'') premiered in the Beijing China Puppet Theater.

References

External links 
  on Tencent Video

2010s American animated television series
2020s American animated television series
2016 American television series debuts
2016 Chinese television series debuts
American children's animated action television series
American children's animated adventure television series
American children's animated comedy television series
Chinese children's animated action television series
Chinese children's animated adventure television series
Chinese children's animated comedy television series
English-language television shows
Animated television series about cats
Television series about deer and moose
Animated television series about monkeys